Bob Dillner (born November 29, 1969) is an American motorsports journalist and television broadcaster. Born in Huntington, New York, he owns and operates Speed51.com. He was also the creator of Trackside Long Island, which first aired in 1992. Afterward, he became a Speed Channel commentator. For 2016 he was a color analyst for Monster Jam on FS1. He currently resides in Concord, North Carolina.

Career

Dillner is an American motorsports journalist and television broadcaster. Born in Huntington, New York, Dillner has worked for FOX Sports covering the top three series of NASCAR, as well as the lead play-by-play announcer for NASCAR K&N Pro Series, NASCAR Whelen Modified Tour and the NASCAR Toyota Series.  Dillner has also covered the Chili Bowl Nationals, and has been on pit road for many different events including Super DIRT week in Syracuse, New York.  Dillner is also the owner of Speed51.com, the largest pavement short-track racing website in America. In 2016, Dillner was the color analyst for Monster Jam on FS1. He did not return for 2017.

References

Bob Dillner

External links
Speed51.com - Short track site co-founded by Dillner

Living people
1969 births
People from Huntington, New York
Motorsport announcers
American reporters and correspondents